Nadia is a female given name.

Nadia may also refer to:
 Nadia district, in the West Bengal state of India
 Toyota Nadia, a compact minivan
 Nadia (film), an unauthorized 1984 made-for-television film biopic of Nadia Comăneci
 Nadia (TV series), a 1988 Iraqi television series
 Nadia: The Secret of Blue Water, an anime by Gainax
 Linux Mint distribution 14